Eanes is a Portuguese surname.

Notable people with this surname include:
 António Ramalho Eanes (born 1936), Portuguese politician
 Gil Eanes (fl. c. 1450), Portuguese explorer
 Gomes Eanes de Zurara (1410–1474), Portuguese chronicler
 Jim Eanes (1923–1995), American musician

Portuguese-language surnames